Vaqo (also, Vago) is a village and municipality in the Astara Rayon of Azerbaijan.  It has a population of 1,598.  The municipality consists of the villages of Vaqo, Lələkəpeştə, and Liəzi.

References 

Populated places in Astara District